Readable may refer to:

 Readability
 Human-readable
 Reading (computer)